Swinton O. Scott III is an American animator, storyboards artist, television director, television producer, and film director. He is best known for his work on The Simpsons.

Career

Scott has worked with producers Lou Scheimer and Hal Sutherland of Filmation, William Hanna and Joseph Barbera, Andy Heyward of DiC Entertainment, Gabor Csupo and Arlene Klasky, and Phil Roman. On September 2, 2021, it was announced that Scott would be directing Diary of a Wimpy Kid, a Disney+-exclusive film released on December 3, 2021.

Directing credits

The Simpsons episodes
He has directed the following episodes:

Season Six
"And Maggie Makes Three"
"The PTA Disbands"

Season Seven
"Bart on the Road"

Season Nine
"Realty Bites"
"The Trouble with Trillions"

Season Ten
"Mayored to the Mob"
"Maximum Homerdrive"

Futurama episodes
"Bendless Love"
"A Leela of Her Own"
"Jurassic Bark"
"Three Hundred Big Boys"

God, the Devil and Bob episodes
"Andy Runs Away"
"Bob Gets Greedy"
"Bob Gets Involved"

The Looney Tunes Show episodes
"Bobcats on Three!"
"It's a Handbag!"

The Angry Beavers episode
"Alley Oops"

Family Guy episode
"If I'm Dyin', I'm Lyin'"

External links 
 Swinton's blog
 

American animated film directors
American television directors
Living people
Primetime Emmy Award winners
Year of birth missing (living people)